The Denchya River is a river of southern Ethiopia.

See also
List of rivers of Ethiopia

References
Denchia

Omo River (Ethiopia)
Rivers of Ethiopia